Protected areas of Slovenia include one national park, three regional parks, several natural parks, and hundreds of natural monuments and monuments of designed nature. They cover about 12.5% of the Slovenian territory. Under the Wild Birds Directive, 26 sites totalling roughly 25% of the nation's land are "Special Protected Areas"; the Natura 2000 proposal would increase the totals to 260 sites and 32% of national territory.

National parks
Triglav National Park

Regional parks
Inner Carniola Regional Park
Kozje Park
Škocjan Caves Regional Park

Natural parks

Beka Natural Park
Boč Natural Park
Drava Natural Park
Golte Natural Park
Snežnik Castle Complex Natural Park
Jareninski Dol Natural Park
Jeruzalem–Ormož Hills Natural Park
Kamenščak–Hrastovec Natural Park
Kolpa Natural Park
Kum Natural Park
Lahinja Natural Park
Ljubljana Marsh Natural Park
Ljutomer Pond and Jeruzalem Hills Natural Park
Logar Valley Natural Park
Lake Maribor Natural Park
Mašun Natural Park
Mrzlica Natural Park
Nanos Natural Park
Negova and Lake Negova Natural Park
Planina Plain Natural Park
Polhov Gradec Hills Natural Park
Ponikve Karst Natural Park
Porezen–Davča Natural Park
Rače Ponds–Požeg Natural Park
Račna Karst Field Natural Park
Rak Škocjan Natural Park
Roban Cirque Natural Park
Sečovelje Salina Natural Park
Municipality of Domžale Revolutionary Traditions Memorial Park
Štanjel Natural Park
Štatenberg Natural Park
Strunjan Natural Park
Šturmovci Natural Park
Tivoli–Rožnik Hill–Šiška Hill Natural Park
Topla Natural Park
Trnovo Forest Natural Park
Udin Forest Natural Park
Moravci Drillholes and Baths Natural Park
Žabljek Natural Park
Zajčja Dobrava Natural Park
Zelenci Natural Park
Zgornja Idrijca Natural Park

Natural monuments
On 1 January 2012, there were 1276 natural monuments in Slovenia.

Natura 2000 areas

Banjšice
Breginj Stol–Planja
Lake Cerknica
Drava
Dravinja Valley
Goričko
Jelovica
Julian Alps
Kamnik–Savinja Alps and the Eastern Karawanks
Karawanks
Kočevje Region–Kolpa
Kozje Region–Dobrava–Jovsi
Krakovo Forest–Šentjernej Plain
Karst Plateau
Ljubljana Marsh
Mur River
Nanoščica–River Basin
Planina Karst Field
Pohorje
Sava Hills–Mountain Walls
Sečovlje Saltpans
Škocjan Inlet
Slovene Hills–Lowlands
Snežnik–Pivka
Trnovo Forest
Trnovo Forest–Southern Outhskirt and Nanos

References

External links 
Environmental Atlas of the Environment of Slovenia. Contains detailed maps of the Natura 2000 sites in Slovenia. Environmental Agency of Slovenia.
Natura 2000 in Slovenia. Ministry of the Agriculture and Environment of the Republic of Slovenia.

 
Slovenia
Nature conservation in Slovenia
National parks
Protected areas